658 Squadron AAC is an Army Air Corps unit of the British Army that provides dedicated aviation support to the 22nd Special Air Service Regiment (22 SAS) for domestic counter terrorism (CT) operations. The squadron is co-located with 22 SAS at Stirling Lines. The press has given the squadron, their helicopters, and the CT response force they enable, the nickname "Blue Thunder". The squadron is part of the Joint Special Forces Aviation Wing.

History

658 Squadron

No. 658 Squadron traces its lineage to the Royal Air Force No. 658 Squadron formed in April 1943 and disbanded in November 1955. 

No. 658 Squadron AAC was formed on 24 October 1969 at Minden as part of the 1 Division Aviation Squadron AAC. In 1978, squadron moved to Soest as part of 4 Regiment AAC and disbanded. The squadron reformed  1982 as part of 7 Regiment AAC based at Airfield Camp, Netheravon. In April 1995, the squadron became a Territorial Army unit part of 7 Regiment AAC (Volunteers). 

On 1 April 2009, the squadron was disbanded at Netheravon.

8 Flight

8 Flight traces it lineage to the Royal Air Force No. 1908 AOP Flight formed on 31 December 1946, disbanded on 7 October 1955 and later reformed on 16 October that year.

On 1 September 1957, 8 Flight AAC was formed as 8 Reconnaissance Flight with the transfer of No. 1908 AOP Flight based at RAF Idris in Libya to the newly formed Army Air Corps. The flight relocated to Kenya where it was re-designated as 8 Flight AAC. The flight subsequently relocated to Aden operating the Westland Scout helicopter. The flight later deployed to Northern Ireland operating the Scout and Bell Sioux helicopters. In 1979, the flight was based at Airfield Camp, Netheravon. In 1984, the Agusta A109A/AM helicopter entered service with the flight. In 1984, the flight was part of 7 Regiment AAC. The flight operated a fleet of four A109As in civilian livery, two of which were captured from the Argentine forces in the Falklands War and allocated to the flight. In 1995, 7 Regiment re-roled as a Territorial Army unit 7 Regiment AAC (V). In 2000, the flight relocated to Stirling Lines.

In 2001, the flight was incorporated into the Joint Special Forces Aviation Wing (JSFAW). The flight operated the Westland Gazelle AH1 helicopter  2007. In 2009, the flight converted from the A109A to four Eurocopter AS365N3 Dauphin helicopters in civilian livery. The flight operated the Gazelle AH1  2012.

Present day

On 1 September 2013, 8 Flight AAC was re-designated as 658 Squadron AAC.

Role

The squadron provides dedicated aviation support to 22 SAS with domestic CT operations. As such, both units are based at Stirling Lines. The helicopters have been filmed taking part in fast-roping exercises.

Operations
On , a Dauphin helicopter was forward-deployed in the early stages of Operation Buckthorn.

Aircraft operated

See also

 List of Army Air Corps aircraft units

References

External links
 Army Air Corps Augusta A109 (archived 2001)

Army Air Corps aircraft squadrons
Special forces of the United Kingdom
Military units and formations established in 2013